Mitchell Schet (born 28 January 1988) is a Dutch footballer who plays as a right winger.

Club career
Schet signed with Feyenoord in 2005, from the youth academy of Utrecht. He played at the FIFA U-17 World Cup in Peru, where the Netherlands reached the semi-finals. Schet made his first-team debut on 23 August 2008 in the Dutch Super Cup against PSV Eindhoven. He made his league-debut on 13 September 2008 against Volendam.

For the 2009-10 season, Schet was loaned out to Excelsior, but returned to Feyenoord during the winter transfer period.

Schet signed a contract with RKC Waalwijk on 7 May 2010, keeping him in Waalwijk until 2012. He signed with Groningen in May 2012, but already left the team a year later as he was released by the team. He signed with ADO Den Haag in July 2013.
In 2015, he signed with Slovak Fortuna Liga club AS Trenčín and won double in 2015-16. After the championship triumph celebrations, he caused a serious car accident. Driving while drunk, he injured himself and two other people, wrecking their car. He was subsequently released by the club.

At the end of July 2019, Schet joined Cypriot club PO Xylotymbou. His contract was terminated in January 2020, effectively making him a free agent. In September 2020, he joined Dutch Tweede Divisie club VV Katwijk.

International career
Born in the Netherlands, Schet is of Surinamese descent. He is a youth international for the Netherlands.

Statistics

Statistics accurate as of last match played on 26 May 2015.

Honours

Club
RKC Waalwijk
Eerste Divisie (1): 2010–11

AS Trenčín
 Fortuna Liga (1):  2015-16
Slovak Cup (1): 2015-16

References

External links
 Voetbal International profile 
 

1988 births
Living people
Dutch footballers
Dutch sportspeople of Surinamese descent
Dutch expatriate footballers
Netherlands youth international footballers
Netherlands under-21 international footballers
Feyenoord players
Excelsior Rotterdam players
RKC Waalwijk players
FC Groningen players
ADO Den Haag players
AS Trenčín players
ŠK Slovan Bratislava players
Eredivisie players
Eerste Divisie players
Slovak Super Liga players
Footballers from Amsterdam
Association football wingers
Dutch expatriate sportspeople in Slovakia
Dutch expatriate sportspeople in Cyprus
Expatriate footballers in Slovakia
Expatriate footballers in Cyprus
Cypriot Second Division players
Tweede Divisie players
VV Katwijk players